Charles Emil Smith (né Schmidoff; March 28, 1901 – December 30, 1995) was a real estate developer and philanthropist in the Washington Metropolitan Area.

Biography
Smith (born Schmidoff), was born in Lipnick, Russian Empire on March 28, 1901 to an Orthodox Jewish family in Russia, the son of Sadie and Reuven Schmidoff. He immigrated to Brownsville, Brooklyn in 1911 speaking only Yiddish upon his arrival. He started as a developer in Brooklyn, but lost everything in the Great Depression.

He moved to Rockville, MD where he first developed apartments and later office buildings. He founded the Charles E. Smith Co. and developed the Crystal City area of Arlington, Virginia. He retired in 1967 and turned to philanthropy.

Philanthropy
He planned a complex in Rockville for Jewish agencies including the Hebrew Home for the Aged, the Jewish Social Service Agency and the Jewish Community Center. He was a trustee of George Washington University (GWU) from 1967 to 1976 as well as Chairman of the Committee on University Development. The Charles E. Smith Athletic Center at George Washington University is named in his honor. He played a key role in developing GW's branch campus in Loudoun County, Virginia.

His contributions to Jewish philanthropy include:
 Charles E. Smith Jewish Day School
 Charles E. Smith Life Communities
 Hartman High School- Charles E. Smith High School for Boys
 Charles E. Smith Family and Prof. Joel Elkes Laboratory for Collaborative Research in Psychobiology
 Charles E. Smith chair in Judaic studies at GWU

Smith held honorary doctorates from Hebrew University of Jerusalem, the Jewish Theological Seminary and George Washington University. In 1997 he was posthumously awarded an Honor Award from the National Building Museum alongside other community developers of Washington, D.C., including Morris Cafritz and Charles A. Horsky.

Personal life
Smith married twice. His first wife was Leah Goldstein of Yonkers whom he married on February 8, 1927; they had two children, Robert H. Smith and Arlene Smith Kogod (married to Robert P. Kogod). Leah died in 1972. His second wife was Miriam Schuman Uretz Smith.

References

Writings

Further reading

External links
 Founding of Smith Life Communities
 
 History of Smith Life Communities

1901 births
1995 deaths

Emigrants from the Russian Empire to the United States
Jewish American philanthropists
City College of New York alumni
George Washington University trustees
20th-century American businesspeople
Smith family (real estate)